Kohlberg is a municipality in the district of Neustadt an der Waldnaab] in Bavaria, Germany. It is situated c.  southwest of Weiden in der Oberpfalz and c.  northeast of Hirschau.

References

Neustadt an der Waldnaab (district)